Matt "The Lord" Zane (born Matthew Zicari; October 7, 1974) is an American singer, musician, suspension artist, and author.

Biography
Zane was born Matthew Zicari in Rochester, New York. After graduating from Musicians Institute of Technology for Guitar Performance, he attended Los Angeles Valley College for music.

Zane was briefly the lead singer of short-lived industrial rock project Lotus Rising with cellist Tina Guo and is currently the creative force behind Society 1.

Since 2008, Zane has held the record for longest body suspension, surpassing the previous holder Criss Angel.

Discography

Solo
 Words as Carriers (InZane Records, 2002)

With Society 1
 Slacker Jesus (InZane Records, 1999)
 Exit Through Fear (Earache Records, 2003)
 The Sound That Ends Creation (Earache Records, 2005)
 The Years of Spiritual Dissent (Crash Music, 2006)
 Live and Raw (InZane Records, 2008)
 A Journey from Exile (2011)
 A Collection of Lies (Independent 2014)
 Rise From The Dead (DSN Music, 2017)

Live Albums
 Guilty Gear XX In L.A. Vocal Edition - Keep Yourself Alive II (Vocals), Bloodstained Lineage (Vocals) (TEAM Entertainment, 2004)

Documentary
 Contrasting Views of People Living Within an Artistic Lifestyle (Evil Now, 2000)

Video Magazines
 Loudtimes Volume 1–3 (Inzane Records, 1999),
 Backstage Pass 1–2 (Inzane Records, 1999–2004)

DVD
 Slacker Jesus Home Video (InZane Records)
 Fearing the Exit (Earache Records, 2004),
 The Creation of Sound (Earache Records, 2005),
 The Strangest Life I've Ever Known (independently released, 2006),
 In Our Own Images (Crash Music, 2006)

Television appearances
Spread Entertainment – Himself (2 episodes, 2007–2008) a.k.a. Spread TV (US title)
 Episode #2.15 (2008) TV episode – Himself
 Episode #1.13 (2007) TV episode – Himself
 Revelation 666 (2006) (TV) (as Matt 'The Lord' Zane) – Himself
 X Rated: The Sex Tapes That Shocked the World (2006) (TV) (as Matt 'The Lord' Zane) – Himself – interviewee
 Dr. 90210* – Himself (1 episode, 2005)
 Buying the Fountain of Youth (2005) TV episode – Himself
 Society 1: Fearing the Exit (2005) (V) – Himself

Videography

As director
 Static-X - "Hollow (Project Regeneration)" (2020, with Xer0)
 Static-X - "All These Years" (2020, with Xer0)
 Static-X - "Bring You Down (Project Regeneration)" (2020, with Xer0)
 Static-X - "Terrible Lie" (2023, with Xer0)

References

1974 births
American male poets
Living people
American heavy metal musicians
American industrial musicians
American male actors
Film producers from New York (state)
Musicians from Rochester, New York